Sulfluramid (N-EtFOSA) is a chemical compound from the group of sulfonic acid amides and per- and polyfluoroalkyl substances (PFASs) that is effective as an insecticide.

Annual production increased from about 30 tons in 2003 to 60 tons in 2013.

Environmental issues 
It is predominantly biotransformed to perfluorooctanesulfonic acid (PFOS), but partly also to perfluorooctanoic acid (PFOA). Sulfluramid benefits from an acceptable purpose in the listing of PFOS to annex B of the Stockholm Convention on Persistent Organic Pollutants.

References

Sulfonamides
Organofluorides